Negin Shirtari Foumani (born 3 March 1998) is a volleyball player from Iran, who plays as a play cards for the Women's National Team and CD Aves team. She participated in the championship in Korea in 2019 with the women's volleyball team.

References 

Iranian women's volleyball players
Living people
1998 births
People from Rasht
Sportspeople from Gilan province